The Baunsberg is a hill in Hesse, Germany.

Hills of Hesse